In phonology, fronting is a sound change in which a vowel or consonant becomes fronted, advanced or pronounced farther to the front of the vocal tract than some reference point. The opposite situation, in which a sound becomes pronounced farther to the back of the vocal tract, is called backing or retraction. Fronting may be triggered by a nearby sound, in which case it is a form of assimilation, or may occur on its own.

Examples

Assimilation 
This is assimilation.

Vowel shifts 
This change occurred in all cases and was not triggered by a nearby front consonant or vowel.

For more information, see First a-fronting and Second a-fronting.

The same sound change occurred in many dialects of Norwegian and Standard Swedish but not in Danish.

Fronting can also take place as part of a chain shift. Thus, words like cot and father are often pronounced with a low-front vowel .

References

See also 
 Palatalization refers to a range of sound changes triggered by high or high-front vowels.

Vowel shifts